Nicholas "Nick" Evans (born 1956)  is an Australian linguist and a leading expert on endangered languages. He was born in Los Angeles, USA.

Holding a Ph.D. in Linguistics from the Australian National University (ANU), he is Head of the Department of Linguistics and Distinguished Professor in the School of Culture, History and Language at the College of Asia and the Pacific at ANU. Formerly, he held a personal chair in the Department of Linguistics and Applied Linguistics at the University of Melbourne.

His research interests include Aboriginal Australian languages, Papuan languages, linguistic typology, historical and contact linguistics, semantics, and the mutual influence of language and culture. He worked at the Dublin Institute for Advanced Studies in 2003 for the school of Celtic Studies. Recent focuses include the way in which diverse grammars underpin social cognition (with Alan Rumsey and others); ongoing fieldwork on various Aboriginal languages of Northern Australia (Dalabon, Iwaidja, Marrku, Bininj Kunwok, Kayardild); Papuan languages (Nen, Idi), work on endangered song-language traditions of Western Arnhem Land (with Allan Marett, Linda Barwick and Murray Garde), and the development of coevolutionary approaches that integrate the dynamic interactions between language, culture and cognition. In addition to his linguistic research he has carried out more applied work in Australian Aboriginal communities in various capacities, including interpreting and preparing anthropologists' reports in Native Title claims, and writing about the new art being produced by artists from Bentinck Island.

Evans signed the Declaration on the Common Language of the Croats, Serbs, Bosniaks and Montenegrins in 2019.

Awards and honours
In 2013, he was awarded an Australian Laureate Fellowship.

Selected works
Evans, Nicholas (2011). Dying Words: Endangered Languages and What They Have to Tell Us, John Wiley & Sons. .

Evans, Nicholas (2005). "Australian Languages Reconsidered: A Review of Dixon (2002)". Oceanic Linguistics  44 (1), pp. 242–286.
Evans, Nicholas (ed.) (2003). The non-Pama-Nyungan languages of northern Australia: comparative studies of the continent's most linguistically complex region. Canberra: Pacific Linguistics. pp. x + 513.
Evans, Nicholas (2003). Bininj Gun-wok: a pan-dialectal grammar of Mayali, Kunwinjku and Kune. (2 volumes). Canberra: Pacific Linguistics.
Evans, Nicholas and Hans-Jürgen Sasse (eds) (2002). Problems of Polysynthesis. Berlin: Akademie Verlag. Studia Typologica, Neue Reihe.
Evans, Nicholas (1998). "Aborigines Speak a Primitive Language". In: Bauer, Laurie; Trudgill, Peter. Language Myths, Penguin Books, pp. 159–168. .

Evans, Nicholas (1995). A Grammar of Kayardild. Berlin: Mouton de Gruyter.

References

External links
 Professor Nicholas Evans - Researchers - ANU, anu.edu.au.
Languages of Southern New Guinea - SNG Project, anu.edu.au.

1956 births
Linguists from Australia
Living people
Australian National University alumni
Academic staff of the Australian National University
Academic staff of the University of Melbourne
Linguists of Australian Aboriginal languages
Paleolinguists
Linguists of Tangkic languages
Linguists of Gunwinyguan languages
Linguists of Papuan languages
Linguists of Yam languages
Signatories of the Declaration on the Common Language
Corresponding Fellows of the British Academy
Academics of the Dublin Institute for Advanced Studies